Wocania indica is a Gram-negative, strictly aerobic, rod-shaped and non-motile bacterium from the genus of Wocania which has been isolated from hydrothermal sulfide from the northwest Indian Ocean Ridg.

References

Flavobacteria
Bacteria described in 2020